Galiat is one of the 51 union councils of Abbottabad District in Khyber-Pakhtunkhwa province of Pakistan. According to the 2017 Census of Pakistan, the population is 957.

Subdivisions
 Ayobia
 Chang Gali
 Donga Gali
 Khera Gali
 Nathia Gali
 Thund Pani

References

Union councils of Abbottabad District